Jordi Quintillà Guasch (born 25 October 1993) is a Spanish professional footballer who plays as an defensive midfielder for St. Gallen in the Swiss Super League.

Club career

Barcelona
Born in Lleida, Catalonia, Quintillà joined UE Lleida's youth setup in 1999, aged only six. In 2009, he moved to FC Barcelona's La Masia, and was promoted to the latter's reserve team in June 2012.

On 10 January 2013, Quintillà was loaned to Segunda División B's CF Badalona, until June. He made his senior debuts for the club, scoring his first goal on 24 February, in a 2–0 home win against Villarreal CF B.

On 26 August 2013, Quintillà moved to CE L'Hospitalet also in the third level, in a season-long loan deal.

Ajaccio
On 25 July 2014, Quintillà signed a three-year deal with French Ligue 2 side AC Ajaccio, after the expiry of his contract with Barça. He made his professional debut on 29 August, starting in a 0–0 away draw against Stade Lavallois.

North America
On 6 August 2015, Sporting Kansas City announced that they had signed Quintillà. While he did not score in 15 appearances, he did net the winner in the penalty shootout as they won away to the Philadelphia Union in the U.S. Open Cup final on 30 September that year.

Quintillà was released by Sporting Kansas City on 23 June 2016. The following 9 February, he signed with North American Soccer League side Puerto Rico FC.

Switzerland
On 19 June 2018, Quintillà returned to Europe, joining FC St. Gallen of the Swiss Super League on a two-year deal.

In March 2021, it was announced that Quintillà would sign with FC Basel as his contract with St. Gallen expired. He joined the club on 1 July for their 2021–22 season under head coach Patrick Rahmen. After playing in five test games, Quintillà played his debut for his new club in the second qualifying round of the 2021–22 UEFA Europa Conference League, a home game in the St. Jakob-Park on 22 July 2021 as Basel won 3–0 against Partizani Tirana. On 22 January 2022, Quintillà returned to St. Gallen on a 3.5-year contract. During his short period with Basel Quintillà played a total of 17 games for them without scoring a goal. Eight of these games were in the Swiss Super League, two in the Swiss Cup, and seven in the Conference League.

Personal life
Quintillà's younger brother, Xavi, is also a footballer, who plays as a defender. Both were in the Barcelona youth system together.

References

External links

1993 births
Living people
Sportspeople from Lleida
Spanish footballers
Footballers from Catalonia
Association football midfielders
Segunda División B players
Ligue 2 players
Major League Soccer players
USL Championship players
Swiss Super League players
CF Badalona players
CE L'Hospitalet players
AC Ajaccio players
Sporting Kansas City players
Sporting Kansas City II players
Puerto Rico FC players
FC St. Gallen players
FC Basel players
Spanish expatriate footballers
Spanish expatriate sportspeople in France
Expatriate footballers in France
Spanish expatriate sportspeople in the United States
Expatriate soccer players in the United States
Spanish expatriate sportspeople in Switzerland
Expatriate footballers in Switzerland